William Gibson (2 February 1738 – 2 June 1821) was an English Roman Catholic prelate. He was president of the English College, Douai from 1781 to 1790, and later became a bishop, serving as the Vicar Apostolic of the Northern District from 1790 to 1821.

Biography
Born in Stonecroft, near Hexham, Northumberland on 2 February 1738, the son of Jasper Gibson and Margaret Gibson (née Leadbitter). He was sent for his education to Douai and served as president of the college from 1781 to 1790.

Gibson was ordained to the priesthood in 1764. Following the death of his older brother Matthew on 17 May 1790, William was appointed the Vicar Apostolic of the Northern District and Titular Bishop of Achantus on 10 September 1790. He was consecrated to the Episcopate at Lulworth Castle by Bishop Charles Walmesley on 5 December 1790.

When the English College at Douai was forced to close in 1795 following the French Revolution, some of the students were settled temporarily at Crook Hall northwest of Durham. In 1804 Bishop Gibson began to build at Ushaw Moor, four miles west of Durham. These buildings, designed by James Taylor, were opened as St Cuthbert's College in 1808.

Bishop Gibson resided principally at York, although sometimes with the resident priest at Durham, Thomas Smith, who, in 1810, he requested as his coadjutor. In 1819, becoming increasing more frail in mind and body, his powers to transferred to Bishop Smith.

He died in office on 2 June 1821, aged 83, at Ushaw and was buried in the college cemetery at Ushaw College which he himself had founded in 1804.

References 

1738 births
1821 deaths
People from Hexham
18th-century Roman Catholic bishops in England
Apostolic vicars of England and Wales
People from Ushaw Moor
19th-century Roman Catholic bishops in England